Gordon Andrews (born 11 November 1934) is  a former Australian rules footballer who played with Richmond in the Victorian Football League (VFL).

Notes

External links 
		

Living people
1934 births
Australian rules footballers from Victoria (Australia)
Richmond Football Club players
Sandhurst Football Club players